Treća strana medalje (Third side of medal) is the third studio album by the Serbian hip-hop artist Marčelo. The album contains 15 songs and features various artists from Serbia and Croatia. The album was released by the end of 2008, and contains different music styles, including pop, rock/rock 'n' roll and blues. The album was accepted by the audience like the first two.

Track listing

Other
The limited edition of the album contained a bonus disc, called "Bonus strana medalje". It featured the members of the Filter Crew, as well as several other artists, like Iskaz. On the bonus disc, there are remixes of three songs from the previous albums: Pozerište, Bol i revolt, Kuća na promaji.

References

2008 albums
Marčelo albums